Man in a Veil is a South Korean television series starring Kang Eun-tak and Uhm Hyun-kyung. The series aired on KBS2 from 7 September 2020 to 10 February 2021.

It was supposed to start on 31 August 2020, but was postponed for a week due to the COVID-19 pandemic.

Synopsis
This drama tells the story of a man with seven-year-old intelligence after an accident, the love and desires of two women surrounding him, and those facing dreamlike miracles on the thresholds of death.

Lee Tae Poong (Kang Eun Tak) has the intelligence level of a seven year old after an accident. Meanwhile, Han Yoo Jung (Uhm Hyun Kyung) is a person with a happy personality that dreams of becoming an announcer. But because her family is poor she has to let go of her dream and start working to provide for her family. She also deals with the guilt from her twin sister’s wrongdoings.

Cast

Main 
 Kang Eun-tak as Lee Taepung / Yoo Min-hyuk
Jo Yong-jin as young Lee Tae-poong
 Uhm Hyun-kyung as Han Yujeong
Kim Da-in as young Han Yoo-jung
 Lee Chae-young as Han Yura
Yoon Seo-jin as young Han Yoo-ra
 Lee Shi-kang as Cha Seojun
Choi Yoon-woo as young Cha Seo-joon

Supporting

Lee Tae-poong's family 
 Yang Mi-kyung as Lee Kyung-hye
Lee Il-hwa as Yoon Soo-hui / Seo Ji-sook
 Chae Bin as Kang Ye-jin
 Lee Myung-ho as Kang Sang-tae

Han Yoo-jung and Han Yoo-ra's family 
 Choi Jae-sung as Han Dae-chul
 Kim Eun-soo as Yeo Sook-ja
 Jang Tae-hun as Han Yoo-myung
Ian Cho as young Yoo-myung
 Seo Woo-jin as Han Dong-ho / Lee Min-woo
Bae Do-hwan as Yeo Bong-joon

Cha Seo-joon's family 
 Hong Il-kwon as Cha Woo-seok
 Kim Hee-jung as Joo Hwa-yeon
 Kim Yoon-kyung as Cha Mi-ri
 Lee Jeong-yong as Koo Chun-soo

Others 

 Kim Jong-don as Baek Min-won
 Choi Ji-young as Eom Hae-soo
 Na Woo-ho as Song Jin-ho
 Song Seung-ha as Yoo-ra's fellow announcer #1
 Kim Ga-ran as Yoo-ra's fellow announcer #2
 Baek Jae-jin as private detective hired by Yoo-ra
 Lee Chae-hyun as Kim Min-joon
 Yoo Yong as Detective Lee Hyuk-jae
 Kim Kyung-min as Park Tae-soo
 Choi Min-geum as Sook-ja's aunt
 Hong Seung-bum as Lawyer Min
 Yoon Duk-yong as Kim Bong-wan
 Na Suk-min as man who guarded Woo-seok's hospital room
 Lee Seong-jae as Woo-seok's doctor

Special appearances 

 Eru as Choi Joon-seok (Ep. 1-10, 15-16, 72-75, 102-105)
 Lee Jin-woo as Kang Sang-hyeon (Ep. 1-16)
 Hong Seok-cheon as Radio PD who helps Yoo-ra (Ep. 1)
 Yun Da-yeong as Park Na-yeong (Ep. 1-2, 8, 29-30, 53-55)
 Park Hyeon-jeong as Mi Ah-jeong (Ep. 1-3)
 Kim Hyun-sook as Na-yeong's mother (Ep. 2, 8)
 Lee Joo-eun as Song Ji-yeon (Ep. 3-4)
 Kim Do-kyeong as Driver Kim / Choi Ji-seok (Ep. 8-12)
 Romina as foreign woman in the hospital (Ep. 20)
 Ryu Ji-kwang as DL Group model (Ep. 74)
 Lee Sang-joon as delivery man (Ep. 99)

Original soundtrack

The following is the official track list of Man in a Veil (Original Television Soundtrack) album. The tracks with no indicated lyricists and composers are the drama's musical score; the artists indicated for these tracks are the tracks' composers themselves. Singles included on the album were released from September 17, 2020, to December 10, 2020.

Viewership 
The last episode had more than 3 million views nationwide (3,502,000) and 1,789,000 in the capital, Seoul.
 In this table,  represent the lowest ratings and  represent the highest ratings.
 N/A denotes that the rating is not known.

Awards and nominations

Notes

References

External links 
  
 

Korean Broadcasting System television dramas
2020 South Korean television series debuts
2021 South Korean television series endings
Korean-language television shows
Television series by Celltrion Entertainment